Maria and Franklin Wiltrout Polygonal Barn, also known as the Alfred Barn, is a historic 14-sided barn located in Fairfield Township, DeKalb County, Indiana.  Built in 1910, the structure is a two-story, wood-frame structure measuring 60 feet in width.  It is topped by a two-pitch gambrel type roof with a 14-sided cupola.  It is one of three 14-sided barns left in Indiana.

It was added to the National Register of Historic Places in 1993.

References

Polygonal barns in the United States
Barns on the National Register of Historic Places in Indiana
Buildings and structures in DeKalb County, Indiana
National Register of Historic Places in DeKalb County, Indiana
Barns in Indiana